This is a list of Members of Parliament (MPs) elected to the State Great Khural at the 2020 Mongolian legislative election.

List of members

References

Elections in Mongolia
State Great Khural